Following are the results of the 2006 AFC Youth Championship qualification.  The Asian Football Confederations AFC Youth Championship 2006 was the 34th instance of the AFC Youth Championship. It was held from 29 October to 12 November 2006 in India. It was the first time for India to host this tournament. Sixteen teams from the AFC qualified to the finals.

Matches
 qualified as hosts

Group 1

Group 2

Group 3

Group 4

Group 5

Group 6

Group 7

Group 8

Group 9

Group 10

Group 11

Group 12

Group 13

Group 14

See also
AFC Youth Championship
AFC Youth Championship 2006

External links
In-depth coverage of the AFC Youth Championship 2006 from IndianFootball.Com, India's Premier Football Site

2006
Qual
Qual